Cordulegaster vanbrinkae is a species of dragonfly in the family Cordulegastridae. It is endemic to Iran and Armenia.  Its natural habitat is rivers.

References

Fauna of Iran
Fauna of Armenia
Cordulegastridae
Insects described in 1993
Taxonomy articles created by Polbot